Triplex Safety Glass was a British brand of toughened glass and laminated glass. The marque is often seen on vehicle and aircraft windscreens.

History
The Triplex Safety Glass Company Ltd was founded in 1912 by Kent-born Reginald Delpech (30 March 1881 - 29 May 1935). The company was established in 1912 to build laminated windscreens in Britain, under French patents.

On 9 September 1929 Triplex formed a joint venture company with Pilkington in St Helens. The company is now part of Pilkington Automotive.

In the 1960s Triplex bought its main competitor British Indestructo Glass, giving it a monopoly in British laminated glass production.

In the 1980s, around 1,000 people worked at the Triplex site in St Helens and about 700 at the site in Kings Norton.

Pilkington retired the Triplex brand in August 1993. The company was formally dissolved in September 2019.

Key people
 Sir Graham Cunningham, Chairman
 Alan Brooke, 1st Viscount Alanbrooke, Chairman, 1954–1956
 Derek Cook, Chairman, 1984–1985
 Sir Barrie Heath DFC, Managing Director, 1960–1968

Structure
The company was headquartered at Eccleston, St Helens, at a factory built in 1928. It had its main plant at Kings Norton in the West Midlands.

The St Helens factory now manufactures under the GKN (Aerospace Transparency Systems) brand. Aerospace glass continues to be made at the site. It is believed that the automotive building fell out of use with the collapse of MG Rover in 2005 (when Pilkington downsized operations), although closure quite possibly predated this.

The Eccleston Site has since been demolished and a new housing estate built on the land.

Products
Triplex made laminated and toughened windscreens and windows for the automotive, rail, marine and aerospace sectors. Particularly widespread is the use of so-called "triplex" adhesives, which result from the bonding of two or more glasses – single or safety – usually via polyvinylbutyric (PVB) membranes. The glazing is welded by heating and later pressing.

Triplex glasses exhibit the maximum impact resistance. This glazing system is distinguished for the optimal use of safety in use since, if it breaks, the glass pieces are held in place by means of the intermediate membranes, preventing serious injury.

References

External links
 Grace's Guides
 Pilkington History 
 Motorsport Magazine April 1970

Aircraft component manufacturers of the United Kingdom
Automotive companies of the United Kingdom
Vehicle safety technologies
British brands
British companies established in 1912
Car windows
Economy of Merseyside
Glassmaking companies of the United Kingdom
Manufacturing companies based in Birmingham, West Midlands
Manufacturing companies established in 1912
Northfield Constituency
Metropolitan Borough of St Helens